University of Erlangen–Nuremberg (FAU) is a public research university in the cities of Erlangen and Nuremberg in Bavaria, Germany. The name Friedrich–Alexander comes from the university's first founder Friedrich, Margrave of Brandenburg-Bayreuth, and its benefactor Alexander, Margrave of Brandenburg-Ansbach.

FAU is the second largest state university in the state of Bavaria. It has 5 faculties, 24 departments/schools, 25 clinical departments, 21 autonomous departments, 579 professors, 3,457 members of research staff and roughly 14,300 employees.

In winter semester 2018/19 around 38,771 students (including 5,096 foreign students) enrolled in the university in 265 fields of study, with about 2/3 studying at the Erlangen campus and the remaining 1/3 at the Nuremberg campus. These statistics put FAU in the list of top 10 largest universities in Germany. In 2018, 7,390 students graduated from the university and 840 doctorates and 55 post-doctoral theses were registered. Moreover, FAU received 201 million Euro (2018) external funding in the same year, making it one of the strongest third-party funded universities in Germany.

FAU is also a member of DFG (Deutsche Forschungsgemeinschaft) and the Top Industrial Managers for Europe network.

History

The university was founded in 1742, in Bayreuth by Frederick, Margrave of Brandenburg-Bayreuth, and moved to Erlangen in 1743. Christian Frederick Charles Alexander, Margrave of Brandenburg-Ansbach (one of the two namesakes of the institution) provided significant support to the early university.
From the beginning, the university was a Protestant institution, but over time it slowly secularized. During the Nazi era, the university was one of the first that had a majority of Nazi supporters in the student council. In 1961, the business college in Nuremberg was merged with the university in Erlangen, so now the combined institution has a physical presence in the two cities. An engineering school was inaugurated in 1966. In 1972, the school of education (normal school) in Nuremberg became part of the university.

Timeline
Below is a short timeline of FAU from its inception to its present form:
 1700–1704: The Schloss of the Margraves at Erlangen is built.
 1743: Friedrich, Margrave of Brandenburg-Bayreuth, issues an edict whereby the university recently founded in Bayreuth is transferred to Erlangen. It has the four faculties of Protestant Theology, Jurisprudence, Medicine and Philosophy.
 1769: The University at Erlangen is given the new name of Friedrich-Alexander-Universität in honour of Alexander, Margrave of Ansbach and Bayreuth.
 1818: The library of the University of Altdorf, dissolved in 1809, is moved to Erlangen.
 1824: The first hospital is built.
 1825: The university moves into the Schloss.
 1920: The WiSo Faculty (Business Administration, Economics & Social Sciences) is established.
 1927: Science is taken out of the Faculty of Arts thus creating the new Faculty of Science.
 1961: The FAU acquires a further faculty through merger with the Nuremberg College of Economics and Social Sciences (founded in 1919). The university's name is now Friedrich-Alexander Universität Erlangen-Nürnberg.
 1966: The Faculty of Engineering is established. (FAU is thus the first of the traditional universities of the old federal republic to incorporate engineering as an independent faculty.)
 1972: The Teacher Training College in Nuremberg is incorporated into the Faculty of Education.
 1993: The FAU celebrates its 250th anniversary.
 1994: The Free State of Bavaria purchases for the university 4.4 hectares of land in Erlangen previously owned by the US military. The area is now called Röthelheim Campus.
 2000: The Bavaria-California Technology Centre opens its headquarters at the University of Erlangen-Nürnberg.
 2000: Inauguration of the Research Centre in Clinical Molecular Biology in Erlangen.
 2001: Opening of the Röthelheim Campus on the site of the old artillery barracks.
 2004: Inauguration of the new building at the WiSo Faculty of Business Administration, Economics & Social Sciences in Nuremberg.

Campuses
A major part of FAU’s campuses is in the city of Erlangen, the minor part in the neighboring city of Nuremberg. Several minor facilities are located in Hof, Fürth, Bamberg, Pleinfeld or Ingolstadt. In sum, there are several hundred FAU properties in the Nuremberg metropolitan area.

Erlangen

In Erlangen, the University has two main sites: one in the city centre (North site) and the other in city's south (South site). To the east of the city is the so-called “Röthelheim Campus” with minor engineering and medical facilities. In addition, the FAU currently has a large number of larger and smaller properties spread over the entire Erlangen city area. Besides the Erlangen Schloss, the university’s Schlossgarten in the city centre is a main sight in Erlangen and very popular among students especially during summer term.

The university’s administration (in the Erlangen Schloss), the Faculty of Humanities, Social Sciences and Theology and the Department of Law (as part of the Faculty of Law and Economics) are located at the North Site (both at Bismarckstraße/Schillerstraße) as well as the Faculty of Medicine and the University Hospital. Also in the city centre is the University Library Erlangen-Nürnberg. The Erlangen University Hospital is one of the biggest university hospitals in Germany.

The Faculty of Science (Erwin-Rommel-Straße/Staudtstraße) and the Faculty of Engineering form the FAU’s South site.

Library

The University Library Erlangen-Nürnberg is the library system of the Friedrich Alexander University and is a regional library for the region of Middle Franconia. As an academic universal library, it offers its users a wide range of specialist literature from all faculties and a variety of services. With approximately 5.4 million volumes, it is Bavaria's largest library outside the state capital Munich. Large parts of the media stock are also accessible in interregional lending. The University Library is a member of the Bavarian Library Network (Bibliotheksverbund Bayern).

Nuremberg

The Department of Economics (as part of the Faculty of Law and Economics) and the Department of Education (as part of the Faculty of Humanities) are in Nuremberg.

The Department of Economics is located northeast of the historic Old Town (Lange Gasse/Maxtormauer). The Department of Education (“Campus Regensburger Straße”) is in the southeast of the city near the Dutzendteich and the former Nazi party rally grounds of Nuremberg.

FAU Busan campus
FAU is the first German university to establish a branch campus in Busan in the Republic of Korea. In November 2009, its campus project received approval from the Korean Ministry of Education, Science and Technology. The FAU Busan Branch Campus offers a Graduate School with a master's degree program in Chemical and Bioengineering and a research center.

In 2014, the university announced its intention of working toward making the Busan-Jinhae Free Economic Zone an educational hub. To this end, FAU Busan works internationally with various companies and universities.

Faculties

In February 2007, the senate of the university decided upon a restructuring into five faculties. Since October 2007, the FAU consists of:
 Faculty of Humanities, Social Sciences, and Theology
 Faculty of Business, Economics, and Law
 Faculty of Medicine
 Faculty of Sciences
 Faculty of Engineering

The following faculties were part of the university (sorted in the order in which they were founded):
 Theological faculty
 Law faculty
 Medical faculty
 Philosophical faculty I (philosophy, history, and social sciences)
 Philosophical faculty II (languages and literature)
 Science faculty I (mathematics and physics)
 Science faculty II (biology, chemistry, and pharmaceutics)
 Science faculty III (geography, geology/mineralogy/paleontology)
 Business- and social sciences faculty (1961) in Nuremberg
 Technical Faculty (1966)
 Pedagogical faculty (1972) in Nuremberg

Faculty of Engineering

Inception
In 1962, after lengthy debate, the Bavarian parliament decided to establish a Faculty of Engineering in Erlangen. Then, the University of Erlangen thus won out against the city of Nuremberg, which, for decades, had been demanding the establishment of a college of engineering in Nuremberg. Since the expansive areas of building land required for this project were not available in the center of Erlangen, the foundations for a new university campus were laid in the south east of the town in 1964. The formal establishment of the Faculty of Engineering, then the seventh faculty at the university, took place in 1966. What was unique at the time was that the various engineering departments were subsumed, as a faculty, into the main university rather than constituting an independent university.

Present status
The Faculty of Engineering at FAU is a young educational and research institution. Since its foundation in 1966. The Faculty has five departments:
 Electrical, Electronic and Communication Engineering
 Chemical and Biological Engineering
 Materials Science and Engineering (This Department was ranked at 10th best in the world according to the Quantitative Ranking of Engineering Disciplines (QRED).)
 Mechanical Engineering
 Computer Science

The Faculty has close connections both with other natural sciences and with traditional subjects at the university. The Faculty of Engineering currently concentrates on the following research fields:
 New Materials and Processes
 Life Science Engineering and Medicine Technology
 Energy Technology and Mobility
 Modeling and Simulation
 Optics and Optical Technologies
 Information- and Communication Technologies
 Micro-/Nano-electronics

Research

Major research areas
FAU claims leadership in a number of research topics. The current eight such major research areas are:
 New Materials and Processes
 Optics and Optical Technologies
 Molecular Life Science and Medicine
 Health Technology
 Electronics, Information and Communication
 Energy, Environment and Climate
 Language – Culture – Region
 Cohesion – Transformation – Innovation in Law and Economics

Excellence initiative
The Excellence Initiative by the German federal and state governments to promote science and research at German universities aims to promote cutting-edge research and to strengthen the higher education and research in Germany to improve its international competitiveness and to make top performers in academia and science visible.
As part of this initiative, FAU was awarded the contract for the Erlangen Graduate School in Advanced Optical Technologies (SAOT), which received 1.9 million euros of annual funding for the next five years. The Cluster of Excellence 'Engineering of Advanced Materials and Processes' (EAM) was also established at FAU as part of the initiative and has been approved in the second round. EAM is funded with 40 million euros.

Cluster of Excellence 'Engineering of Advanced Materials
The Cluster of Excellence 'Engineering of Advanced Materials – Hierarchical Structure Formation for Functional Devices' (EAM) is the only interdisciplinary research collaboration of its type in Germany to focus on the investigation of functional materials and their processing at all length scales. The main research focus is on the fundamental and applied aspects of designing and creating novel high-performance materials. It is part of the Excellence Initiative of the German Research Foundation.

Erlangen Graduate School in Advanced Optical Technologies
The Erlangen Graduate School in Advanced Optical Technologies (SAOT) was founded in 2006. SAOT's scientific focus lies on optics and optical technology, two fields which are considered key technologies of the 21st century. SAOT is currently funded with seven million euros.

National High Performance Computing Center 
in 2020 the FAU joined the National High-Performance Computing (NHR) alliance in Germany. This program is designed to provide researchers with access to state-of-the-art computing resources exceeding the limits of local HPC resources, including supercomputers. By joining the NHR program, the FAU has expanded its computing infrastructure, enabling its researchers to conduct more advanced simulations and analyses in various fields of study.

Research institutions

Central institutions

Interdisciplinary centers

Research centers and centers of excellence

Partnerships
Friedrich-Alexander-Universität Erlangen-Nürnberg (FAU) is the first German university to establish a branch campus in Busan in the Republic of Korea. FAU has contacts with approximately 500 universities all over the world, including many of the world's top universities like the University of Cambridge, Duke University, UCL, Imperial College London and many more.

Academic ranking

Global academic rankings of FAU can be seen in the table on the right.

Measured by the number of top managers in the German economy, FAU ranked 25th in 2019.

In 2017, ARWU ranked FAU 4th in Germany in Engineering/Technology and Computer Sciences, 6th in Germany in Clinical Medicine and Pharmacy and 7th in Germany in Natural Sciences and Mathematics.

QS World University Rankings 2018 ranked FAU as the academic institution that has produced the most widely cited publications in Germany (global 21st). 2017, Reuters ranked FAU as the 50th most innovative university globally (2nd Germany, 6th in Europe). In the Reuters ranking report published in 2019, FAU has been rated as the most innovative university in Germany and as the 2nd in Europe.

In Academic Ranking of World Universities for year 2014, FAU ranked second among German universities in Engineering/Technology and Computer Sciences group for all four ranking parameters TOP, FUN, HiCi and PUB.

Awards

Alexander von Humboldt Professorships
In 2010, the newly announced professor of physics and co-director of the Max Planck Institute for the Science of Light, Prof. Vahid Sandoghdar was awarded an Alexander von Humboldt Professorship, Germany's highest-endowed international research award, endowed with €3.5 million.
In the year 2011, the second in a row, FAU communications engineer and researcher Prof. Dr.-Ing Robert Schober (born 1971) was awarded an Alexander von Humboldt Professorship, entailed with €3.5 million, for an algorithm developed by him which is found in many modern phones today.
In 2013, Prof. Oskar Painter received an Alexander von Humboldt Professorship as well. Prof. Painter is another new co-director of the Max Planck Institute for the Science of Light.

German Excellence Initiative
The University of Erlangen-Nürnberg was successful within the German Universities Excellence Initiative in competing for a "cluster of excellence" and a graduate school.
The Cluster of Excellence 'Engineering of Advanced Materials' (EAM)" focuses on interdisciplinary developing new materials, joining engineering and natural sciences. The Erlangen Graduate School in Advanced Optical Technologies emphasizes a strong focus in optical and photonics technology in the natural sciences, in engineering and the medical sciences and aims for a concise doctoral education. It is supplemented with a Master's degree program in the same topics.

After an in-depth evaluation, both programs were extended for the third phase of the German Excellence Initiative in 2012 until 2017. They contribute significantly to the research funding of the University, including five new research buildings, permanent new technical facilities and research and teaching staff. They also aim to increase the international perception of the contributing fields of research in Erlangen.

Notable alumni and professors
 Louis Agassiz, biologist and geologist
 Johann Christian Daniel von Schreber (1739–1810), naturalist, studied mammals.
 Robley Dunglison (1798-1869), personal physician to Thomas Jefferson, considered the "Father of American Physiology"
 Samuel Hahnemann (1755–1843), founder of homeopathy
 Alexander von Humboldt (1769–1859), Geographer and Explorer, attended lectures in Chemistry and Physics.
 Friedrich Rückert (1788–1866), orientalist and poet.
 Georg Simon Ohm (1789–1854), physicist, Ohm's law, named after him.
 Justus von Liebig (1803–1873), chemist, "father of the fertilizer industry".
 Ludwig Andreas Feuerbach (1804–1872), philosopher, associated with the Young Hegelians, an atheist.
 Karl von Hegel (1813–1901), historian, father-in-law to Felix Klein and son of the philosopher Hegel
 Felix Klein (1849–1925), Mathematician
 Hermann Emil Fischer (1852–1919), chemist, Nobel Prize in Chemistry 1902
 Eduard Buchner (1860–1917), chemist, Nobel Prize in Chemistry 1907
 Emanuel Lasker (1868–1941), world chess champion, mathematician, philosopher.
 Emmy Noether (1882–1935), mathematician, Noether's theorem, named after her.
 Hans Geiger (1882–1945), physicist, Geiger counter
 Ludwig Erhard (1897–1977), Chancellor of Germany 1963–1966
 Otto Friedrich Ranke (1899–1959), physiologist
 Wolf-Dieter Montag (1924–2018), German physician, and international sports administrator
 Alma Adamkienė (1927–), First Lady of Lithuania 1998–2009
 Johanna Narten (1930–2019), historical linguist and first woman member of the Bavarian Academy of Sciences and Humanities
 Harald zur Hausen (1936–), virologist, Nobel Prize in Physiology or Medicine 2008
 Heinrich von Pierer (1941–), former CEO of Siemens AG (1992–2005).
 Karlheinz Brandenburg (1954–), audio engineer, developer of the MP3 audio codec.
 Burkard Polster (1965–), mathematician, host of Mathologer YouTube channel.
 Naser Sahiti (*1966), mechanical engineer and elected Rector of the University of Prishtina
 Philipp Plein (born 1978), founder in the Philipp Plein brand
 Julia Lang (entrepreneur) (born 1989), serial entrepreneur and founder of VEERT

Gallery

Points of interest
 Botanischer Garten Erlangen, the university's botanical garden

See also
 List of early modern universities in Europe
 Recktenwald Prize
 Top Industrial Managers for Europe
 Fraunhofer Society
 Max Planck Institute for the Science of Light
 Erlangen
 Botanischer Garten Erlangen
 Nuremberg

References

External links

 

 
1742 establishments in the Holy Roman Empire
Educational institutions established in 1742
Universities and colleges in Bavaria
University of Erlangen-Nurnberg
Education in Nuremberg
Engineering universities and colleges in Germany